Remembrance Day of the Latvian Legionnaires, often known simply as the Legionnaire Day (Leģionāru diena) or March 16 (16. marts) in Latvia, is a day when soldiers of the Latvian Legion, part of the Waffen-SS, are commemorated. From 1998 until 2000, it was officially recognized as a "Remembrance Day for Latvian soldiers" by the Saeima.

The day has been controversial as the Legion was formally a unit of Nazi Germany and the remembrance day has been seen by Russia as an attempt to glorify Nazism. Others point out that no one has ever been convicted of committing war crimes as a member of the Legion and hold that it was a purely military unit fighting against the Soviet Union that had occupied Latvia in 1940.

Origins

The idea of a Remembrance Day for the Latvian legionnaires was raised in exile by the  veterans' organisation in 1952. The date of March 16 was chosen because in 1944 both divisions of the Latvian Legion, the 15th (1st Latvian) and the 19th (2nd Latvian) fought alongside each other, for the first and only time, against the Red Army.

From March 16 to 18, 1944 heavy battles were fought on the eastern bank of the Velikaya River for "Hill 93.4", a strategically important height, defended by the 15th and the 19th Waffen-SS divisions. On March 16 at 6:40, the Soviet assault began with a massive artillery barrage. At 7:00 the Soviet tanks and infantry launched an attack on "Hill 93.4" and captured it at 11:00 as the defenders withdrew. On March 18 at 17:40 the reinforced and approximately 300-men-strong 15th Division, led by Colonel , recaptured the hill in a counterattack with relatively small losses – seven non-commissioned officers and soldiers killed, 20 wounded and five missing. After that the Red Army did not try to attack there again.

History

1989/90–2000 
Remembrance Day of the Latvian legionnaires has been publicly observed in Latvia since 1989/90. It was officially recognized as a "Remembrance Day for Latvian soldiers" by the Saeima in 1998, a compromise between the For Fatherland and Freedom/LNNK party who wanted to establish the day as the "Remembrance Day for the Latvian Legion" and other members of the coalition fearing the potential effect such a move would have on the international reputation of Latvia. In 1998 the procession to lay flowers at the base of the Freedom Monument drew the attention of foreign media and the following year the State Duma condemned the event as "a glorification of Nazism". In 2000, the Latvian government abolished it as an official commemoration day. Observance continued unofficially.

2005–2008 
In 2005, a counterdemonstration was dispersed by police, arresting some of its participants; and the procession itself was condemned by the Simon Wiesenthal Center. In 2006, the Latvian government tried to bring the situation under control by fencing off the Freedom Monument, with Riga City Council claiming it required restoration. Some later questioned this statement, as politicians named various other reasons for the move, the enclosed area was much larger than needed for restoration, and the weather did not seem appropriate for restoration. The unapproved events took place despite the ban and 65 participants were arrested by Latvian police, two of the arrested participants being citizens of Estonia. In 2006, laws requiring approval to arrange gatherings were ruled out as unconstitutional.

On March 16, 2007, the government mobilized the police force to guard the vicinity of the monument and the day went by relatively peacefully. The veterans' organizations Daugavas Vanagi and National Association of Latvian soldiers have announced that they dissociate themselves from ultra-radicals who organize processions at the monument and advised patriotic Latvians to attend other events. In 2008, the confrontation was limited to verbal arguments and insults.

2009–2011 
Following the 2009 Riga riot, Riga City Council banned the 2009 procession and two counterdemonstrations, citing fears of unrest. Around 300 people disobeyed the ban, walking to lay flowers at the Freedom Monument under heavy police protection. A few counterdemonstrators were arrested. The head of the Anti-Fascist Committee of Latvia had invited its supporters to go on "an excursion" around Old Riga that day.

In 2010, Riga City Council banned the procession and a counterdemonstration. On March 15 the Riga District Court overruled the ban, and 500 to 1,000 people participated in the 2010 commemoration events in Riga the next day. In 2011, to avert provocation and public disturbances all six both pro- and anti-Legionnaire Day events were once again disallowed. Nonetheless, around 1,000 people went on the procession and approximately 100 protested against it.

2012–present 
In 2012, around 2,000 people took part in the procession and 1,200 police officers were employed to maintain order in Riga. Prime Minister Valdis Dombrovskis called for coalition ministers from National Alliance not to participate in the events, warning that otherwise they might lose their minister positions. Three people were detained; one for displaying fascist symbols, one for displaying Soviet symbols and one for disturbing the work of police officers.

On March 11, 2014, the government of Latvia agreed to forbid ministers to attend March 16 events. Nevertheless, the Minister of Environmental Protection and Regional Development  informed of his intention to take part in the procession like he had done for the past 16 years, resulting in Cilinskis losing his ministerial post. Protesters from the "Association Against Nazism" were moved to a fenced-in zone in adjacent Bastejkalns Park where they installed improvised gallows. The day passed without serious incident, with seven people arrested for various misdemeanour charges.

In 2013, Saeima rejected a proposal from the National Alliance to amend the law on Holidays and Remembrance Days and make Legionnaire Day a national remembrance day. In 2018 and 2019 Saeima turned down similar proposals from National Alliance.

In 2016, British YouTuber and freelance journalist Graham Phillips was detained for disrupting the day's events and resisting police orders, after which he was deported from Latvia and denied further entry into the country for the next three years.

In 2017, five people were detained during the procession in Riga, two for resisting the police and three for violating the regulations on meetings, processions, and pickets.

In 2021, no public remembrance events took place on March 16 due to the ongoing COVID-19 pandemic in Latvia.

Controversy 

As formally a part of the Waffen-SS, the Latvian Legion is seen by some as being a Nazi unit, while others point out that it fought only the Soviet Union which had previously occupied and annexed Latvia, it is not responsible for the Holocaust (since it was founded more than a year after Latvian Jews were murdered or sent to concentration camps) or any other Nazi war crimes and should be viewed as a separate entity being recognized as such by the US. Even though up to 80–85% people were conscripted, it was officially named Volunteer Legion to circumvent the Hague Convention of 1907 prohibiting drafting inhabitants of occupied territories by the occupying power.

In Latvia 
The government of Latvia does not recognize March 16 as an official remembrance day and has declared that Latvia commemorates its fallen soldiers on Lāčplēsis Day (November 11). People are allowed to commemorate the fallen on March 16 on their own private accord, but higher officials and members of the government do not participate at the commemorative events taking place in Riga centre in their official capacity. The Latvian Ministry of Foreign Affairs has stressed that no Nazi uniforms, symbols, or slogans appear on this or other days in Latvia, as they are illegal.

On March 16, 2012 Efraim Zuroff during his visit to Riga to protest against the legionnaires' procession, stated in an interview to Latvian State television LTV1 that the "Latvian SS Legion was not involved in the crimes of the Holocaust" but also stated, as he has done every year since 1999, "although these units were not involved in crimes against humanity, many of their soldiers had previously served in the Latvian security police and had actively participated in the mass murder of civilians, primarily Jews."

According to 2017 research by the University of Latvia and SKDS, from 2012 to 2017, public support for Legionnaire Day had decreased from 38% to 33%. Researcher Mārtiņš Kaprāns noted a "more pronounced tolerance" and that "a favourable attitude towards the Lestene memorial has grown both among Latvians and Russians".

In Russia 
Russia alleges that the Latvian Legion carried out punitive actions against partisans and the civilian population in the territory of modern Latvia, Poland, Belarus, Ukraine and Russia (like the Operation Winterzauber).

Internationally 
In 2011, the European Commission against Racism and Intolerance (ECRI) adopted a report on Latvia, expressing "concern as regards the authorisation of certain public events to commemorate two incidents and the authorities' reaction in this connection. As concerns the first incident, every year, on March 16, a gathering commemorating soldiers who fought in a Latvian unit of the Waffen SS is held in the centre of Riga. In this connection, ECRI regrets that, in spring 2010, an administrative district court overruled a decision of the Riga City Council prohibiting this procession" and recommended "that the Latvian authorities condemn all attempts to commemorate persons who fought in the Waffen SS and collaborated with the Nazis. ECRI further recommends that the authorities ban any gathering or march legitimising in any way Nazism".

In 2013, United Nations special rapporteur on racism submitted a communication to Latvia concerning the events of March 16. In 2018, the European Parliament adopted a resolution on the rise of neo-fascist violence in Europe, noting that "every year on 16 March thousands of people gather in Riga for Latvian Legion Day to honour Latvians who served in the Waffen-SS". In 2019, Canada condemned the event.

Leanid Kazyrytski has argued that, even though the Nuremberg Tribunal excluded Latvian Waffen SS units from the list of criminal organisations, the Latvian Legion does possess all the features attributed to a criminal organisation by the Nuremberg Tribunal.

Traditions

Traditionally a memorial service is held in Riga Cathedral, after which the participants go in procession to the Freedom Monument where they lay flowers. Another ceremony receiving much less publicity takes place at the war cemetery in Lestene, Tukums Municipality.

Participating organizations
Organizations whose members have been seen to participate in events:
National Alliance. Traditionally members organize a flag alley at the Freedom Monument when the procession arrives.
Gustavs Celmiņš Centre – an organisation seeking to revive the fascist Pērkonkrusts movement.
Organizations that support veterans of the Legion and participate in events:
Club 415 – Latvian nationalist youth organisation.
Popular Front of Latvia – Latvian political organisation.
Parties whose members have been seen to participate in events
Union of Greens and Farmers – a green/agrarian and conservative political alliance
For Fatherland and Freedom/LNNK – a right-wing conservative party
New Era Party – a centre-right liberal-conservative party
People's Party – a centre-right conservative party

Organizations that have demonstrated against the events 
National Bolshevik Party
Anti-Fascist Committee of Latvia
Latvian Russian Union
Nochnoy Dozor

References

External links

 March 16 Explained. History Foundation of Latvia
 LatvianLegion.org, history, representation in press and media, and INS deportation case against Vilis Hāzners
 Documentary outlines Nazi occupation and the Latvian Legion. March 23, 2020. Public Broadcasting of Latvia. Retrieved: March 23, 2020
 Collier, Mike (March 16, 2016). Special Report: Voices of March 16. Public Broadcasting of Latvia. Retrieved: October 26, 2018

Day
Spring (season) events in Latvia